Odontogomphus donnellyi is a species of dragonfly of the family Gomphidae, 
known as a pinchtail. 
It is endemic to north-eastern Queensland, Australia, where it inhabits rainforest streams.
It is a medium-sized and slender dragonfly with black and greenish-yellow markings.

Odontogomphus donnellyi is the only known species in the genus Odontogomphus.

Gallery

See also
 List of Odonata species of Australia

References

Gomphidae
Odonata of Australia
Insects of Australia
Endemic fauna of Australia
Taxa named by J.A.L. (Tony) Watson
Insects described in 1991